Pashakend may refer to:
 Atsarat, Armenia
 Marmarik, Armenia